USCGC Bollard (WYTL-65614) is a cutter in the U.S. Coast Guard.

Bollard is a small icebreaking harbor tug that operates in Long Island Sound and north to Narragansett Bay.  Her homeport is New Haven, Connecticut. She was constructed at Western Boat, in Tacoma, Washington in 1966 and was commissioned in February 1967. As an icebreaking tug, the ship breaks ice on the Connecticut River in the winter to allow commercial traffic to pass.

In warmer weather, Bollard serves many missions including servicing aids to navigation, search and rescue and law enforcement. Bollard and her crew conduct search and rescue operations as necessary regardless of the time of year. The officer-in-charge is a chief boatswain's mate.

Bollard was awarded the Coast Guard Unit Commendation for service during the period of 2 Jul 86 to 6 Jul 86.

On 26 February 2015 Bollard was featured in a news story about Coast Guard ice breaking operations on National Public Radio.  In January 2018 Bollard was damaged during icebreaking operations on the Connecticut River.

References

External links
 USCG page on USCGC Bollard

1967 ships
Ships of the United States Coast Guard
USCG 65' small harbor tugs
Ships built by the Western Boat Building Company